Baylor University Medical Center (Baylor Dallas or BUMC), part of Baylor Scott & White Health, is a not-for-profit hospital in Dallas, Texas. It has 1,025 licensed beds and is one of the major centers for patient care, medical training and research in North Texas. 

In 2013, Scott & White merged with Baylor Health Care System to form Baylor Scott & White Health.

History
In 1903, the hospital opened as Texas Baptist Memorial Sanitarium in a 14-room renovated house with 25 beds. It received its charter from the state government in October 1903 and had financial support from the Baptist General Convention of Texas. The nursing school was established in 1918. The hospital was renamed Baylor Hospital in 1921 and then Baylor University Hospital in 1936 to emphasize its relationship with the Baptist-affiliated Baylor University in Waco, Texas. The Baylor College of Medicine, College of Dentistry and School of Pharmacy were co-located with the hospital. The Florence Nightingale Maternity Hospital opened in 1937 on the same grounds. Financial difficulties due to the ongoing World War II forced the College of Medicine to move to Houston. The hospital faced an uncertain future since it no longer had the support of an affiliated medical school and its buildings were in need of renovation. Some of the physicians at the hospital who were also professors at the College of Medicine chose to stay with the hospital instead of moving to Houston.

The 1950s signaled a milestone in the development of the hospital. With the construction of the seven-story, 436-bed George W. Truett Memorial Hospital in 1950, Baylor became the fifth-largest general hospital in the country. In 1959, Florence Nightingale Maternity Hospital was replaced with a newly expanded Women's and Children's Hospital, later renamed Karl and Esther Hoblitzelle Memorial Hospital. At this point "medical center" was accordingly added to the hospital name.

Baylor Health Care System was formally established in 1981 with Baylor University Medical Center at Dallas as its flagship hospital and corporate headquarters.

Specialty centers

Baylor University Medical Center is home to more than 20 specialty centers that are designed to treat a range of medical conditions. Some examples:

 Baylor Scott & White Charles A. Sammons Cancer Center
 Heart and Vascular Services
 Baylor Scott & White Neuroscience Center
 Annette C. and Harold C. Simmons Transplant Institute
 Digestive Disease Services
 James M. and Dorothy D. Collins Women and Children's Center
 Baylor Scott & White George Truett James Orthopaedic Institute
 Trauma Services
 Darlene G. Cass Women's Imaging Center

Medical School affiliation

The medical center is affiliated with the Texas A&M Health Science Center College of Medicine.

The hospital has no current affiliation with Baylor College of Medicine nor Baylor University.

References

External links
 Baylor University Medical Center Dallas
 Baylor Scott & White Health

Texas A&M University System
Hospitals in Dallas
Teaching hospitals in Texas
Hospitals established in 1903
1903 establishments in Texas
Trauma centers